Diederrick Joel Tagueu Tadjo (born 6 December 1993) is a Cameroonian footballer who plays as a forward for Saudi Arabian club Al-Hazem on loan from Marítimo.

Club career

Londrina
Born in Nkongsamba, Joel moved to Brazil in September 2009, joining Iraty's youth setup. In March 2011 he moved to neighbouring Londrina (which also had the same owner, Sérgio Malucelli), and was promoted to the first-team in 2012, after impressing in the youth squads.

Joel made his first-team debut on 28 March 2012, coming on as a late substitute in a 0–1 away loss against Coritiba, for the Campeonato Paranaense championship. He scored his first goal four days later, netting his side's only in a 1–1 home draw against Toledo Colônia Work.

In the 2014 season, Joel played an important role in Londrina's Paranaense winning campaign, and also scored regularly for the side in Série D. On 31 July 2014 he scored a brace in a 2–1 home success against Santos, for the campaign's Copa do Brasil.

Coritiba (loan)
On 4 September 2014 Joel was loaned to Coritiba for the remainder of the season, being subsequently negotiated with a German unnamed team. He made his Série A debut three days later, again from the bench in a 0–0 away draw against Bahia.

Joel scored his first goal in the Brazilian top flight on 10 September, netting the last of a 3–0 home success against Chapecoense. Seven days later he scored a brace in a 3–1 home win against São Paulo, but fell into a hole into the locker room tunnel after going out to celebrate the last goal.

Cruzeiro
On 16 December 2014 Joel moved to fellow league team Cruzeiro, for a R$2.5 million fee. He made his debut for the club on 1 February of the following year, scoring the winner in an away success over Democrata-GV.

Joel was bought outright by Raposa in May 2015. However, he struggled with injuries during the campaign, and appeared in only 11 league matches, scoring one goal.

Loan spells
On 11 January 2016 Joel was loaned to fellow league team Santos, for one year. He made his debut for the club on 30 January, coming on as a second-half substitute in a 1–1 Campeonato Paulista home draw against São Bernardo.

On 19 January 2017, Joel signed a one-year loan contract with Botafogo.

On 20 June 2017, Joel signed a loan contract until the end of the year with Avaí.

On 8 January 2018, Joel signed a loan contract until the end of the season with Marítimo.

Return
In June 2019 he suffered a heart problem.

In October 2019, Joel rejoined Cruzeiro and started to train with the team squad.

Marítimo
On 7 August 2020, Joel signed a two-years contract with Marítimo.

Al-Hazem
On 18 January 2023, Joel joined Saudi club Al-Hazem on loan.

International career
He was ruled out of the 2019 Africa Cup of Nations due to a heart defect.

Career statistics

International goals
Scores and results list Cameroon's goal tally first.

Honours
Londrina
Campeonato Paranaense: 2014

Santos
Campeonato Paulista: 2016

References

External links
Cruzeiro official profile 
SM Sports profile 

1993 births
Living people
Cameroonian footballers
Cameroonian expatriate footballers
Association football forwards
Campeonato Brasileiro Série A players
Campeonato Brasileiro Série D players
Primeira Liga players
Saudi First Division League players
Londrina Esporte Clube players
Coritiba Foot Ball Club players
Cruzeiro Esporte Clube players
Santos FC players
Botafogo de Futebol e Regatas players
Avaí FC players
C.S. Marítimo players
Al-Hazem F.C. players
Cameroon youth international footballers
Cameroon under-20 international footballers
2019 Africa Cup of Nations players
Cameroonian expatriate sportspeople in Brazil
Cameroonian expatriate sportspeople in Portugal
Cameroonian expatriate sportspeople in Saudi Arabia
Expatriate footballers in Brazil
Expatriate footballers in Portugal
Expatriate footballers in Saudi Arabia
Cameroon international footballers
People from Nkongsamba